Rochray Glacier is a glacier about 5 nautical miles (9 km) long, located just east of Hendersin Knob on Thurston Island and flowing south to Abbot Ice Shelf in Peacock Sound. First delineated from air photos taken by U.S. Navy Operation Highjump in December 1946. Named by Advisory Committee on Antarctic Names (US-ACAN) for Lieutenant (j.g.) Samuel Rochray, U.S. Navy, helicopter pilot on USS Glacier in February 1960, who made several flights in which new parts of Thurston Island were discovered. Jordan Nunatak stands between Rochray and Cox Glacier.

See also
 List of glaciers in the Antarctic
 Glaciology

Maps
 Thurston Island – Jones Mountains. 1:500000 Antarctica Sketch Map. US Geological Survey, 1967.
 Antarctic Digital Database (ADD). Scale 1:250000 topographic map of Antarctica. Scientific Committee on Antarctic Research (SCAR). Since 1993, regularly upgraded and updated.

References
 

Glaciers of Thurston Island